() is an Irish phrase used to bid goodbye to someone who is travelling home. A literal translation is "safe home", which is used in the same way in Hiberno-English. Slán ("safe") is used in many Irish-language farewell formulas; abhaile means "homeward".

In Ireland, "slán abhaile" often appears on signs on roads leaving a town or village. It is on official signs encouraging drivers to drive safely from town to town.

In Northern Ireland, the phrase has also appeared on many Irish Republican murals as a farewell to the British Armed Forces, the ending of whose presence was a major goal of Irish republicanism.

References

Irish words and phrases
Slogans
Irish Republican Army